Professor Vittorio Colizzi is an Italian virologist and one of the most eminent HIV/AIDS researchers in Europe. He directs the Immunochemical and Molecular Pathology laboratory in the biology department of Tor Vergata University in Rome. With his French colleague Luc Montagnier he has participated in many conferences, particularly in Africa, to combat the propagation of HIV.

External links
 Some publications (in Italian)

Italian virologists
Living people
Year of birth missing (living people)
Place of birth missing (living people)